Kheyr Khujeh-ye Olya (also Romanized as Kheyr Khūjeh-ye ‘Olyā; also known as Kheyr Khūjeh-ye Bālā) is a village in Atrak Rural District, Dashli Borun District, Gonbad-e Qabus County, Golestan Province, Iran. At the 2006 census, its population was 463, in 94 families.

References 

Populated places in Gonbad-e Kavus County